The fork-tailed sunbird (Aethopyga christinae) is a bird in the family Nectariniidae. The species was first described by Robert Swinhoe in 1869. 

It is found in China, Hong Kong, Laos, and Vietnam.

Its natural habitat is subtropical or tropical moist lowland forests. These small birds, with decurved bill, call a soft and frequent "zwink-zwink" and a metallic trill. The bird appears in the most commonly used postal stamp of Hong Kong.

References

fork-tailed sunbird
Birds of South China
Birds of Laos
Birds of Vietnam
fork-tailed sunbird
Taxonomy articles created by Polbot